Monroe Boston Strause was an American piemaker whose innovations included graham-cracker crust, chiffon pie, and black-bottom pie. He was a "pie celebrity" whose name was "a household word."

Strause was born in 1900 in Los Angeles. In 1919 he was hired by his uncle who ran a wholesale pie business. In his early twenties, Strause took over the business, following his uncle's retirement. He became a consultant in the 1930s after selling his company.

Because of improvements in oven reliability and consistency, homemade and increasingly complex cakes had been overtaking pie as a popular American dessert, which inspired Strause to his experimentations. He considered pie to be the "Great American Dessert," superior to most other foods.

Strause's technique was more scientific in nature; he called his recipes "formulas." The publisher of his book Pie Marches On described it this way: "He has reduced pie baking to an exact science and measures each ingredient with the care of a pharmacist." His focus on quality combined with secrecy and showmanship allowed him, according to The Globe & Mail, to earn "a bank president’s salary out of pie."

He was an early pioneer of the celebrity chef ethos. In 1960, Strause was hired as a consultant by Cannon Foods Inc. of Bridgeville, Delaware, to create recipes based on Cannon food products.

Strause and his wife Violet Marian had a daughter, born May 21, 1938, and a son.

He died in 1981.

Books
 Pies for Profit (1938)
 Pie Marches On (1939)

Patents
 Dry grater
 Meringue pie
 Pie marker, method of finishing meringue pies and the resulting meringue pie
 Method of making fruit pie

Images from patents

References

People from Los Angeles
American bakers
Pastry chefs
Year of birth missing
Year of death missing